The 6th BRICS summit was the sixth annual diplomatic meeting of the BRICS, a grouping of major emerging economies that includes Brazil, Russia, India, China and South Africa. It was hosted by Brazil, as the first host country of the current five-year summit cycle; the host city was Fortaleza. Though Brazil had previously hosted a four-member BRIC summit in April 2010, 2014 marked its first full BRICS summit; the 2010 summit in Brasília did not officially include South Africa, who were only invited as guests as a prelude to their gaining full membership in December 2010. Argentine President Cristina Kirchner was a special guest of the summit, and the BRICS leaders met with their UNASUR counterparts shortly after. The 6th BRICS summit resulted in the official inauguration of the New Development Bank, a multilateral development bank intended as an alternative to the World Bank and International Monetary Fund.

Background
Following the 2013 BRICS summit in Durban, South Africa, the BRICS countries released a joint statement summarising the results of their discussions and naming Brazil as the host country for the 2014 summit. Having agreed to set up a new international development bank during the 2013 summit, the member countries intended to complete the arrangements for the bank prior to the 2014 summit. The summit was initially scheduled for March 2014, but was shifted to a later date at China's request; it was ultimately held on 14–16 July 2014.

Participants

The heads of state and heads of government that participated in the summit were:

The 6th BRICS summit was Narendra Modi's first major international summit as Prime Minister of India. In addition to the five BRICS leaders, Cristina Fernández de Kirchner, President of Argentina, was invited to join the proceedings.

Agenda
At the summit, the BRIC nations agreed to create the US$100 billion New Development Bank (NDB) to allow states to pool resources for economic stabilization. The countries also set forth plans to acquire reserves of $100 billion (€90.8b billion) through investment from the BRICS nations. The BRICS nations also signed an agreement on cooperation between the BRICS nations' export credit agencies: EXIAR (Russia); ABGF (Brazil), ECGC (India), SINOSURE (China) and ECIC (South Africa). In a press release, the group wrote: "We remain disappointed and seriously concerned with the current non-implementation of the 2010 International Monetary Fund (IMF) reforms, which negatively impacts on the IMF's legitimacy, credibility and effectiveness." The NDB is designed to represent all five of the group's member nations – its headquarters will be in Shanghai, the institution's first president will be from India, the bank's first regional office will be in Johannesburg, the inaugural chairman of the board of governors will be from Russia and the first chairman of the board of directors will be from Brazil. The presidency, with a term of five years, will rotate among the members of the BRICS.

Bilateral meetings
During the summit, Xi Jinping was said to have told Narendra Modi that China was willing to consider expanding the Shanghai Cooperation Organisation to include India as a full member at the 2014 SCO summit. The summit further established the principles of non-interference and mutual benefit underpinning bilateral relations within the BRICS.

BRICS–UNASUR summit

The BRICS held a summit with the UNASUR leaders in Brasília on 16 and 17 July.

Invited UNASUR heads of state
 – Cristina Fernández de Kirchner
 – Evo Morales
 – Michelle Bachelet
 – Juan Manuel Santos
 – Rafael Correa
 – Donald Ramotar
 – Horacio Cartes
 – Ollanta Humala
 – Dési Bouterse
 – José Mujica
 – Nicolás Maduro

Gallery of participating leaders
Members:

References

06
2014 conferences
2014 in Brazil
2014 in international relations
21st-century diplomatic conferences (BRICS)
Diplomatic conferences in Brazil
History of Brasília
Fortaleza
July 2014 events in South America
21st century in Brasília